The 326th Infantry Division (326. Infanterie-Division) was the only Eastern Front (Ost Front) veteran division to have fought in the battles of Normandy.  It was formed on November 9, 1942, shortly after its return from Southern Russia to serve as an occupation force in France. On May 5, 1943, the division was transformed into a static division. The 326th Infantry Division was destroyed during the Battle of Normandy. A new 326th Volksgrenadier Division (326. Volksgrenadier-Division) was formed on September 4, 1944, in Galanta by redesignation of the new 579th Volksgrenadier Division of the 32nd mobilisation wave. In 1945 the division, separated into two groups, entered U.S. captivity in the Ruhr Pocket and Harz respectively.

Operational history

The 326th Infantry Division spent its entire operational history on the Western Front, taking part in the Battles of Normandy under Army Group D (Heeresgruppe D) and the Ardennes under Army Group B (Heeresgruppe B).

Organisation

1942

 Grenadier-Regiment 751, I-III Battalions
 Grenadier-Regiment 752, I-III Battalions
 Grenadier-Regiment 753, I-III Battalions
 Artillerie-Regiment 326, I-III Battalions
 Schnelle-Abteilung 326
 Pionier-Bataillon 326
 Infanterie-Divisions-Nachrichten-Abteilung 326

1944

 Grenadier-Regiment 751, I and II Battalions
 Grenadier-Regiment 752, I and II Battalions
 Grenadier-Regiment 753, I and II Battalions
 Artillerie-Regiment 326, I-IV Battalions
 Divisions-Füsilier-Kompanie 326  (later expanded to Füsilier-Bataillon 26)
 Panzer-Jäger-Abteilung 326
 Pionier-Bataillon 326
 Infanterie-Divisions-Nachrichten-Abteilung 326

Commanding officers
 Lieutenant General Friedrich von Drabich-Waechter (1944)
 Major General Dr. Erwin Kaschner (1945)
 Lieutenant General Friedrich

References

 Tessin, Georg. Verbände und Truppen der deutschen Wehrmacht und Waffen-SS 1939 - 1945 Volume 9

Military units and formations established in 1942
Military units and formations disestablished in 1945
Infantry divisions of Germany during World War II